Thomastown Church is a medieval church and National Monument in County Kilkenny, Ireland.

Location

Thomastown Church is located in the centre of Thomastown, immediately behind the Protestant Church and north of the River Nore.

History

The church was founded by Thomas FitzAnthony, a Cambro-Norman knight who was granted land here in 1215 by John, King of England and Lord of Ireland. It belonged to Inistioge Augustinian Priory (est. 1210). It may also have had Dominican associations. After the Reformation the nave was modified for use by the Anglican Church of Ireland. In 1809 the present Catholic church was built on the site of the south aisle.

Church

Thomastown Church was built as a nave and chancel with north and south aisles. The ruins today consist of the north aisle arcade (five arches with quatrefoil pillars, decorated capitals and clerestory) the west gable and a fragment of the crossing tower.

References

Churches in County Kilkenny
Archaeological sites in County Kilkenny
National Monuments in County Kilkenny
Former churches in the Republic of Ireland